Give Me An A is a 2022 anthology feature film in response to the overturning of Roe v. Wade. The film uses 16 short film segments and a wraparound film to weave together each filmmaker's specific response to the Supreme Court decision. The film was created to be a fast reaction and was conceived of and completed in three months, an unusually fast timeline for a feature film. 

The film won the Gold Audience Choice Award from Brooklyn Horror Film Festival less than two weeks after the film was completed.

The film's cast includes Alyssa Milano, Virginia Madsen, Gina Torres, Milana Vayntrub, Jennifer Holland, Sean Gunn, Molly C. Quinn, Jason George, and Jackie Tohn.

The film was created and produced by Natasha Halevi. The producing team also includes Giselle Gilbert, Jordan Crucchiola, Jonna Jackson, Jessica Taylor Galmor, Alyssa Matusiak and Stephanie Williams.

The film segments and directors include “The Voiceless” by Meg Swertlow, "DTF" by Bonnie Discepolo, "Good Girl" by Danin Jacquay, Written by Matthew Tyler Vorce and Danin Jacquay, "Our Precious Babies" written by Annie Bond, directed by Erica Mary Wright, "The Walk" by Sarah Kopkin, "Medi-Evil", written by Rowan Fitzgibbon and Lexx Fusco, directed by Monica Moore-Suriyage, "Sweetie" written by Madison Hatfield, directed by Caitlin Hargraves, "Abigail" by Natasha Halevi, "Plan C" by Megan Rosati, "Hold Please" by Hannah Alline, "God's Plan" by Avital Ash, "Crone" by Mary C. Russell, "Crucible Island" written by Danielle Aufiero and Laura Covelli, directed by Valarie Walsh, "Vasectopia" written by Natasha Halevi, directed by Kelly Nygaard, "The Last Store" by Loren Escandón, "Traditional" by Lexx Fusco, directed by Francesca Maldonado, and the wraparound - “The Cheerleaders” written and directed by Natasha Halevi.

References 

American anthology films
Abortion-rights movement in the United States
2022 films